Mount Farley is a conspicuous rock peak,  high, standing at the west side of Scott Glacier,  east of McNally Peak, in the Queen Maud Mountains of Antarctica. It was discovered in December 1934 by the Byrd Antarctic Expedition geological party under Quin Blackburn, and named at that time by Richard E. Byrd for the Hon. James Farley, United States Postmaster General.

References 

Mountains of the Ross Dependency
Amundsen Coast
Queen Maud Mountains